The 1998–99 Turkish Cup was the 37th edition of the tournament that determined the association football Süper Lig Turkish Cup champion under the auspices of the Turkish Football Federation (TFF). champion under the auspices of the Turkish Football Federation (TFF). Galatasaray successfully contested Beşiktaş on both legs of the finals. The results of the tournament also determined which clubs would be promoted or relegated.

First round

Second round

Third round

Fourth round

Fifth round

Sixth round

Quarter-finals

Semi-finals

Summary table 

|}

1st leg

2nd leg

UEFA Cup playoff
It is a one-legged match between the teams of Ankaragücü and Sakaryaspor, who were eliminated in the semi-finals, for the third place. The third place match was played on 3 June 1999. Despite the fact that there was no match under the name of the third place match in the Turkish Cup before, an extra match to be played to determine the team that will participate in the UEFA Cup from the Turkish Cup, since the two teams that reached the final this season have qualified for the UEFA Champions League by taking the first two places in the league. was needed. This match was played in the play-off style on a neutral ground at a later date than the final match. After this year, the status was changed and in the event of the same situation, the team that came first after the teams that participated in the Champions League was given the right to participate in the UEFA Cup.

Final

1st leg

2nd leg

See also
 1998–99 1.Lig

References

Turkish Cup seasons
Cup
Turkish